"Run on Love" is a song recorded by Swedish musician Lucas Nord. It features vocals by Swedish singer Tove Lo, who co-wrote the song. The single, taken from Nord's 2013 debut album Islands, reached number one on Billboard's Dance Club Songs chart the week ending 2 January 2016, giving Nord his first U.S. chart topper and Lo her third consecutive number one on this chart. The song's music video featured a relationship as seen from the eyes of a boyfriend (through the viewer of the video) as he spends time with his girlfriend (played by Lo) through the streets of Stockholm, Sweden.

Track listing
2013 release 
1 "Run on Love"  (Radio Edit) – 3:58  
2 "Run on Love"  (Extended Mix) – 4:50  
3 "Run on Love"  (Emil Hero Remix) – 3:54  
4 "Run on Love"  (Wickman Remix) – 6:35  
5 "Run on Love"  (Callaway & Rosta Remix) – 6:21  
6 "Run on Love"  (Joaquin Remix) – 4:45

2015 release 
1 "Run on Love"  (Radio Edit) – 3:58
2 "Run on Love"  (JKGD Radio Edit) – 3:29
3 "Run on Love"  (Extended Mix) – 4:50
4 "Run on Love"  (JKGD Extended Mix) – 4:43
5 "Run on Love"  (Babyboi Remix) – 5:30
6 "Run on Love"  (Pri Yon Joni Remix) – 6:30
7 "Run on Love"  (MARAUD3R Remix) – 6:01
8 "Run on Love"  (Tonekind Remix) – 4:52
9 "Run on Love"  (Funky Junction Remix) – 4:44

2015 re-release 
1. "Run on Love"  (Dave Audé Club Mix) – 5:55
2. "Run on Love"  (Tony Moran & Deep Influence Mix) – 8:07
3. "Run on Love"  (Rasmus Faber Remix) – 5:31
4. "Run on Love"  (Emil Héro Remix) – 3:54
5. "Run on Love"  (Wickman Remix) – 6:35
6. "Run on Love"  (Callaway & Rosta Remix) – 6:21
7. "Run on Love"  (Joaquin Remix) – 4:45

Charts

Weekly Charts

Year-end

References

External links
 
 

2013 singles
2013 songs
2015 singles
Tove Lo songs
Songs written by Tove Lo